This is a list of anime by release date which covers Japanese animated productions that were made between 1946 and 1959. After World War II, Japan was occupied by the allies which mainly consisted of the Americans. During the shift from the Empire of Japan to a democracy, the animation industry continued producing new animated films. The first anime broadcast on TV did not come though until 1958 when Mole's Adventure was released. This marked two major milestones as it was also the first ever color animation in the country. The first full-length color animation was also released in 1958 with the title The Tale of the White Serpent, in America it was also known as Panda and the Magic Serpent. Animated television series were later released in the 1960s which include Astro Boy, the first major successful anime.

Notable births
 August 19, 1948 - Toshio Suzuki, producer.
 January 29, 1950 - Katsuhito Akiyama, animation director, screenwriter, storyboard artist
 October 10, 1955 - Tetsurō Amino, director
 January 13, 1956 - Akitaro Daichi, director, producer, photography director
 1959 - Koichi Chigira, animator, director, writer

See also
List of anime by release date (pre-1939)
List of anime by release date (1939–1945)
1960 in anime
History of anime
List of years in animation

References

External links 
Japanese animated works of the period, listed in the IMDb

Release date
Anime debuts by date
Years in anime
1940s anime films
1940s in Japan
1940s in animation
1950s in Japan
1950s anime films
1950s in animation